The 1836 United States presidential election in Kentucky took place between November 3 and December 7, 1836, as part of the 1836 United States presidential election. Voters chose 15 representatives, or electors to the Electoral College, who voted for President and Vice President.

Kentucky voted for Whig candidate William Henry Harrison over the Democratic candidate, Martin Van Buren. Harrison won Kentucky by a margin of 5.18%.

Results

References

Kentucky
1836
1836 Kentucky elections